Union Township is one of the seventeen townships of Hancock County, Ohio, United States. As of the 2010 census, the population was 1,783, of whom 1,009 lived in the unincorporated portions of the township.

Geography
Located in the western part of the county, it borders the following townships:
Blanchard Township - north
Liberty Township - northeast corner
Eagle Township - east
Van Buren Township - southeast corner
Orange Township - south
Richland Township, Allen County - southwest
Riley Township, Putnam County - west
Blanchard Township, Putnam County - northwest corner

Two villages are located in Union Township: Mount Cory in the south, and Rawson in the east.

Name and history
It is one of twenty-seven Union Townships statewide.

Union Township was organized in 1832.

Government
The township is governed by a three-member board of trustees, who are elected in November of odd-numbered years to a four-year term beginning on the following January 1. Two are elected in the year after the presidential election and one is elected in the year before it. There is also an elected township fiscal officer, who serves a four-year term beginning on April 1 of the year after the election, which is held in November of the year before the presidential election. Vacancies in the fiscal officership or on the board of trustees are filled by the remaining trustees.

References

External links

Townships in Hancock County, Ohio
Townships in Ohio